Brad Johnson (born March 6, 1951) is an American politician from the U.S. state of Montana. A member of the Republican Party, he is the present chairman of the Montana Public Service Commission.

Biography
Born in Lake Forest, Illinois, he graduated from the University of Illinois (Class of 1976) before moving to Montana in 1980. He owned an auto parts store and worked for RightNow Technologies in Bozeman. He also served as a district representative for Congressman Ron Marlenee and worked as an agricultural extension agent.

Johnson challenged Democratic Congressman Pat Williams in 1990 and ran for the Republican nomination for United States Senate in 2002 before he was elected Secretary of State of Montana in 2004, defeating Yellowstone County Commissioner Bill Kennedy. He lost reelection to state Superintendent of Public Instruction Linda McCulloch in 2008.

Johnson withdrew from the race for Public Service Commissioner in 2010 after pleading guilty to driving under the influence in Broadwater County. He subsequently entered an alcohol treatment program. He ran for Secretary of State in 2012, but again lost to McCulloch.

Johnson was elected Public Service Commissioner for District 5 in 2014, defeating Democrat Galen Hollenbaugh, and was chosen to be chairman of the commission by his colleagues. He announced his candidacy for Governor of Montana in the 2016 election, but withdrew from the race in January citing fundraising concerns and commitment to his duties on the Public Service Commission.

Electoral history

References

External links
Montana Public Service Commission: About Brad Johnson, Chairman
Brad Johnson at Ballotpedia
Our Campaigns – Brad Johnson (MT) profile

|-

1951 births
Businesspeople from Montana
Living people
Montana Republicans
People from Lake Forest, Illinois
People from Lewis and Clark County, Montana
Secretaries of State of Montana
University of Illinois alumni